Amanullah Sardari (born 22 August 2000) is an Afghan footballer who plays for Shaheen Asmayee F.C. and the Afghanistan national football team.

International career
Sardari made his senior international debut on 10 October 2017 in a 3–3 draw with Jordan in AFC Asian Cup qualification.

Honors

Club
Shaheen Asmayee
Afghan Premier League Champion: 2017
Afghan Premier League Runner-Up: 2018

References

External links

Profile at Football Database
Profile at ESPN FC

1999 births
Living people
Afghan Premier League players
Shaheen Asmayee F.C. players
Afghan footballers
Afghanistan international footballers
Association football defenders